The year 1877 in architecture involved some significant events.

Buildings and structures

Buildings

 Galleria Vittorio Emanuele II (shopping arcade) in Milan, designed by Giuseppe Mengoni, is completed.
 Galleria dell'Industria Subalpina in Turin, designed by Pietro Carrera, is completed.
 Manchester Town Hall in Manchester, England, designed by Alfred Waterhouse, is completed.
 Trinity Church (Boston) in the United States, designed by Henry Hobson Richardson, is consecrated.
 New railway stations for the North Eastern Railway (United Kingdom) are completed at York, largely designed by Thomas Prosser, and Middlesbrough, designed by William Peachey.
 Maria Pia Bridge in Porto, Portugal, built by Gustave Eiffel, is completed.
 Rebuilt Ardverikie House in Scotland, designed by John Rhind, is completed.

Events
 March 22 – Society for the Protection of Ancient Buildings established by William Morris and others meeting in Bloomsbury, London.
 Richard Norman Shaw appointed architect to Bedford Park, London.

Awards
RIBA Royal Gold Medal – Charles Barry (junior).

Births

 May 14 – Randall Wells, English Arts and Crafts architect (died 1942)
 June 12 – Johann Friedrich Höger, German architect (died 1949)
 December 6 – Paul Bonatz, German architect (died 1956)
 Frank Baines, English Arts and Crafts architect (died 1933)

Deaths
 February 23 – Thomas Talbot Bury, English architect and lithographer (died 1809)
 May 8 – Edmund Sharpe, English architect and architectural historian (born 1809)
 October 8 – John Raphael Rodrigues Brandon, English Gothic Revival architect (born 1817)

References

Arch
Architecture
Years in architecture
19th-century architecture